Arena Rock Recording Company ("Arena Rock" or "ARRCO") is an independent record label based in Portland, Oregon. Albums are distributed by Redeye in the United States and Koch in Canada.

Arena Rock was formed in 1995 in Brooklyn, New York, by Greg Glover and Dan Ralph as a hobby label. Glover later began working on the label full-time after leaving London Records. In 2004, Arena Rock moved to Portland, Oregon.

Roster

 Actionslacks
 The Album Leaf
 Jon Auer
 The Autumn Defense
 The Boggs
 Calla
 Creeper Lagoon
 Daniel Amos
 The Ecclesia
 Elf Power
 Germans
 The Gloria Record
 Grand Mal
 Harvey Danger
 Hem
 Home
 Illyah Kuryahkin
 Liars
 The Life And Times
 Luna
 Mink Lungs
 Minus the Bear
 Mitch Mitchell's Terrifying Experience
 Mono
 Larry Norman
 On! Air! Library!
 Oneida
 Pilot to Gunner
 Sabertooth
 The Sheila Divine
 Solex
 Ken Stringfellow
 Superdrag
 Swords
 Talkdemonic
 Wroom

Compilations 
 Fuel Soundtrack – 1997
 This Is Next Year: A Brooklyn-Based Compilation – 2001
 Bridging the Distance, a Portland, OR covers compilation' to benefit p:ear – 2007

See also 
 List of record labels

References

External links 
 Official site
 INDIETOWN, U.S.A. - Willamette Week
 Greg Glover Talks Larry Norman, the Man and the Anthology - Willamette Week

American independent record labels
Companies based in Portland, Oregon
Electronic music record labels
Record labels established in 1995
Alternative rock record labels
Rock record labels
Experimental music record labels
Ambient music record labels
Indie rock record labels
Rock and roll record labels
Oregon record labels
Privately held companies based in Oregon
1995 establishments in New York City